An EMC problem (or Electromagnetic compatibility problem) occurs when one piece of electronic equipment or an  electromagnetic system is adversely affected by the operation of another. 
One example might be breakthrough by the high field strengths produced by a nearby radio transmitter. EMC problems are not always due to defects in the transmitter, and so do not necessarily require improvements in the radio transmitter design, such as reducing its radiated harmonics. It may be that the immunity of the affected equipment is poor due to inadequate shielding, or filtering of sensitive inputs. EMC problems can have a range of effects on equipment, and there are ways to mitigate or eliminate them in practice. Effective EMC mitigation techniques may differ by the type of equipment that malfunctions, and by the nature of the strong radio frequency field.

Singing sparks and allied effects 

The singing spark can be thought of as the ultimate form of the rusty bolt effect. This is a situation where the output of a transmitter is clean, the receiver is able to reject the transmitter's frequency but some object energised by the RF field is then able to generate harmonics or act as a non-linear mixer which generates intermodulation products.

To solve this the best thing to do is to locate the rusty bolt and either remove it or render it harmless. Possible examples of rusty bolts include the pole holding an aerial, cast iron drainpipes, loose manhole covers and guy wires on radio masts.

TV and radio equipment

Common problems

Motorboating 

Motorboating can be seen in radio equipment, it can be regarded as a self-inflicted EMC problem. While this idea of self-imposed EMC effects could include all manner of unwanted feed back and crosstalk effects within an item of equipment, for reasons of brevity no discussion of internal feed back (which does not involve a signal leaving an item of equipment) will be included here.

The best method of curing this defect is to improve the RF shielding and the RF filtering of all power, audio and control leads entering the affected unit.

Harmonics generated in situ 

In situ harmonics occur when an RF current flows through a device, and harmonics are generated due to the non-linear nature of the device. This can be regarded as a rusty bolt effect which exists within the malfunctioning device. A good example of this is the pair of diodes which protect the receivers in many VHF rigs lacking an electromechanical relay to switch between transmit and receive (such as the 144 MHz DJ-F1E) from the transmitter's RF output. In the case of the DJ-F1E, these diodes can create intermodulation products when the radio set is overloaded.

Reproduction of the signal in an IF stage 

It is possible for the unwanted signal to enter an Intermediate frequency stage, and if it falls within the passband of the stage, it can cause an unwanted effect. In an AM system, it is possible that the unwanted signal will be amplified by the linear stage and appear finally to the detector as if it were a sideband of the carrier, it is possible sometimes for harmonics of an HF transmitter generated within a TV set to enter the video IF (which is at about 30 MHz). These harmonics which enter the TV IF could give similar herring bone pattern effects to those seen when harmonics of the HF transmitter are generated in the front end.

In FM systems where the IF stage gain is very high and the stage is designed to be linear, it is likely that if the unwanted signal is at least 10 dB weaker than the wanted signal that the capture effect will result in the receiver ignoring the unwanted signal. If however the unwanted signal is stronger than the wanted signal then it is likely that the receiver will be unable to demodulate the wanted signal. This is related to the normal method of jamming FM systems, to jam an FM signal it is normal to transmit a signal which is 10 dB stronger (at the front end of the target receiver) and is within the plateau of most narrow IF stage.

Cures

Braid-breakers

If an electronic device with a long coaxial aerial lead is disturbed by a signal from a HF transmitter then the braid of the coaxial should be considered as a path of entry of RF into the affected device. One additional feature which can assist a braid breaker is the use of an RF ground, a quarter wavelength of wire will act as an RF ground even when it goes nowhere. This is because the quarterwave transforms the infinite impedance into a zero impedance.  The quarterwave length of wire can be regarded as an artificial earth for RF purposes.

By adding a braid-breaker filter to the system common mode signals will be attenuated while unbalanced signals will be allowed to pass unhindered. This is also something which is added to long leads in military electronic equipment which is intended to continue to function even after being subjected to a nuclear electromagnetic pulse (EMP) and also would increase the likelihood of an electronic device surviving a nearby lightning strike (direct lightning hits are very hard to protect against).

For UHF TV a wide range of good designs exist, these include a ferrite RF choke on the downlead and some networks of passive components.

RF chokes on leads 

RF chokes are a well used method for filtering many leads on communication equipment.  In common with the braid breaker the intention is to suppress common mode signals.  One popular method of making an RF choke is to use a large ferrite bead where the cable passes through the hole. Such chokes can often be seen on the power connection leads of laptops and on the video signal leads of computer monitors.

The addition of RF chokes can often reduce greatly the RF current flowing through a TV set and hence improve the immunity of the installation.

Filters in the aerial lead 

If the receiver's input is routed via a device which rejects the unwanted signals then this additional filtering can improve the immunity of the installation. It is the case that the additional filter will improve the situation. When a transmitter needs to be colocated with a receiver where the frequency difference is very small (for example 145.000 and 145.600 MHz) the cavity filters can be used on both the transmitter and the receiver to improve the purity of the transmitter and the immunity of the receiver.

One design for VHF/UHF TV which also has the ability to filter out 144 MHz, 432 MHz and 1296 MHz signals has been created by a Russian (UA9FAD).. A design for UHF TV which is designed for the six meter band (50 MHz) has been published by the UK six meter group.  One design for FM radios (band II) has been created by a German (DF9CY)

Audio equipment

Different transmitter modes 

It is possible for the non-linear circuits within audio equipment to act as an inadvertent radio receiver. In the case of FM transmitters a click may be heard as the RF field appears and also when it disappears.

In the case of amplitude modulation it is possible for the original audio to be recovered by the affected device. AM is still used for longwave and mediumwave broadcasting, and sometimes in communications equipment used by services such as the fire brigade, military or police.

A weird animal quacking or an unintelligible human voice is a likely sign that the transmitter is using single-sideband modulation. SSB (single-sideband) tends to be used in applications where long range communication is needed.  Here, the non-linear device is mixing frequencies, but because the carrier has been suppressed, it is not possible to restore the original audio with such a simple demodulator.

Stereo leads as a dipole 

It is the case that a stereo system with external speaker attached by long leads to the main unit (holding the audio electronics) can be troubled by EMC problems which are caused by the speaker leads acting as a dipole antenna.

One method of curing this is to add a ferrite choke to the speaker leads close to where they enter the main unit.

Rectification in the audio equipment 

According to the RSGB handbook one common way in which stereo systems are affected is when the RF current picked up by the speaker cable, and then flows through the feedback circuit into an early stage in the audio amplifier. The RF is then rectified when it flows through the base/emitter junction of a bipolar transistor.

References 

 Radiocommunication handbook (RSGB), 
 The Radio Amateur's Guide to EMC, Robin Page-Jones (G3JWI) (RSGB), 1992, 

Electromagnetic compatibility